Shadow of the Colossus is a 2018 action-adventure video game developed by Bluepoint Games and published by Sony Interactive Entertainment for the PlayStation 4. It is a remake of the original game developed by Team Ico and released in 2005 for the PlayStation 2, using ultra-high definition art assets. The remake's development was led by Bluepoint, who developed the earlier PlayStation 3 remaster, with assistance from Japan Studio. The developers remade the assets from the ground up, but Shadow of the Colossus retains the same gameplay from the original title aside from the introduction of a new control scheme. The game received critical acclaim, with critics considering it superior to the original.

Gameplay
The gameplay is nearly identical to the original version of the game, aside from reworked controls.  Progression through Shadow of the Colossus occurs in cycles. Beginning at a central point in a landscape, the player seeks out and defeats a colossus, and is returned to the central point to repeat the process. Most colossi are located in remote areas, such as atop cliffs or within ancient structures.

Players are able to choose from several options when playing. On a standard PlayStation 4, the game runs at a 1080p resolution at 30 frames per second. On a PlayStation 4 Pro, the game can run either at a 1440p resolution (upscaled to 4K) at 30 frames per second, or at a 1080p resolution at 60 frames per second.

Development 
Sony had announced a remake of Shadow of the Colossus for the PlayStation 4 during their Electronic Entertainment Expo 2017 press conference. The remake was led by Bluepoint, who had developed the earlier PlayStation 3 remaster.

The idea for a remake had come after a conversation Bluepoint developers had: they wanted to create a new definitive version of the original game, and after speaking with friends at Sony Japan, it was agreed upon. Bluepoint producer Randall Lowe and technical director Peter Dalton stated in an interview with Game Informer that the original Shadow of the Colossus was on many of their employees' Top 5 of all-time list.

The developers remade all the game's assets from the ground up, but the game retains the same gameplay from the original title along with the introduction of a new control scheme. The game uses the original codebase from the PlayStation 2 game. The art staff used the PlayStation 2 version to create parity with the PlayStation 4 version.

The game was released on February 6, 2018 in North America; February 7 in Europe, Australia and New Zealand; and February 8 in Japan.

Reception

Shadow of the Colossus received "universal acclaim" reviews from critics, according to review aggregator Metacritic.

Brett Makedonski's 10/10 score on Destructoid stated that "Nothing in this entire game is forgettable. For a game predicated on methodically finding and exposing these creatures' weak points, you'd be hard-pressed to find a weak point throughout the entire experience."

Nick Plessas's score of 8.5/10 on EGMNow said that "Remakes can seem like the low-hanging fruit of game development, but Bluepoint does Shadow of the Colossus justice with an evolution of the classic game that improves the overall experience while maintaining its familiar spirit."

Tom Hurley from GamesRadar+ gave the game a score of 4 out of 5 stars saying that "Both a great remaster and an enjoyable 'new' game in its own right that takes you on a journey in a way few things can."

9.7/10 was Marty Sliva's score on IGN with the summary: "Shadow of the Colossus on PS4 is a stunning return to the classic that wowed us in 2005."

The game was nominated for "PlayStation Game of the Year" at the Golden Joystick Awards, and won the Freedom Tower Award for Best Remake at the New York Game Awards. In addition, it won the award for "Game, Classic Revival" at the National Academy of Video Game Trade Reviewers Awards, whereas its other nomination was for "Art Direction, Fantasy".

Sales
In the week of its launch, Shadow of the Colossus sold 73% higher than the original game. The game also was the top selling game in the U.K for that week.

It sold 21,900 copies on PlayStation 4 within its first week on sale in Japan, which placed it at number 2 on the all format sales chart.

Notes

References

External links

2018 video games
Action-adventure games
Art games
Kaiju video games
Fantasy video games
PlayStation 4 games
PlayStation 4-only games
PlayStation 4 Pro enhanced games
Open-world video games
Fiction about resurrection
Single-player video games
Sony Interactive Entertainment games
Fiction about sacrifices
Video game remakes
Video games developed in Japan
Video games developed in the United States
Video games scored by Kow Otani
Bluepoint Games games